Glögg, gløgg or glögi is a spiced, usually alcoholic, mulled wine or spirit.  Associated especially with Sweden, it is a traditional Nordic drink during winter, especially around Christmas.

In the Nordic countries, hot wine has been a common drink since at least the 16th century. The original form of glögg, a spiced liquor, was consumed by messengers and postmen who travelled on horseback or skis in cold weather. Since the early 19th century, glögg has been a common winter drink, mixed and warmed with juice, syrup, and sometimes with a splash of harder spirits or punsch.

Glögg recipes vary widely; variations commonly start with white or sweet wine or spirits such as brandy or cognac. The production of glögg begins by boiling water and adding spices to it. After a few minutes of simmering, the mixture is sieved and fruit juice, wine or clear spirits are added. Other versions begin by warming up the wine, alcohol, and sugar (not boiling it) and letting the spices steep in it overnight. The most common spices in glögg are cloves, cinnamon, cardamom and ginger. Other common ingredients can include citrus peel from oranges or lemons, raisins, or almonds.

Glögg can also be made without alcohol by replacing the wine with fruit or berry juices. In shops ready-made glögg is usually based on grape juice, sometimes also blackcurrant juice, mixed fruit juice, apple juice or wine. There are also stronger, rum-based types of glögg. Ready-made glögg from shops is warmed up before use, but if it is wine-based or high in alcohol content, it should not be heated to boiling point. It is common to add whole almonds or raisins to glögg while it is being warmed up or just before drinking.

Glögg came to Finland from Sweden. The Finnish word glögi comes from the Swedish word glögg, which in turn comes from the words glödgat vin or hot wine. At the end of the 19th century, glögg mixed with wine was drunk, but due to prohibition, consumption of glögg almost stopped completely. When prohibition was lifted in the 1930s glögg was advertised in Fenno-Swedish magazines, and in the 1950s and 60s, the drinking of glögg was a Fenno-Swedish tradition. At the end of the 1960s and beginning of the 1970s, glögg recipes began to also appear in Finnish language magazines, after which glögg became a Christmas tradition in the whole of Finland.

While mulled wine (hõõgvein) was long known and popular in Estonia, Swedish-style glögg spread into Estonia only in the 1990s, after the country re-opened to outside influences following the dissolution of the Soviet Union. Local commercial production of glögg started in 1995.

See also 

 Grog
 Mulled wine

Notes

References

External links
Get Into The Holiday Spirit With Scandinavian Glogg

Alcoholic drinks
Hot drinks
Nordic Christmas traditions
Christmas in Denmark
Christmas in Sweden 
 Christmas in Norway 
Christmas in Finland